Sport is an organised or unorganised recreation.

Sport or sports may also refer to:

Teams
Sport Boys, a Peruvian football team
Sport Club do Recife, a Brazilian football team
Vaasan Sport, a Finnish ice hockey team commonly known as Sport

Arts, entertainment, and media

Music

Groups and labels
Remember Sports, an indie rock band from Ohio known from 2014 to 2017 as Sports
The Sports, an Australian rock band

Albums
Sports (Bill Cosby album), an album by Bill Cosby
Sports (Huey Lewis and the News album), an album by Huey Lewis and the News
Sports (Modern Baseball album), an album by Modern Baseball
Sports (Tokyo Incidents album), an album by Tokyo Incidents
S.P.O.R.T.S., an album by T-Square

Periodicals
Sport (New Zealand magazine), a New Zealand literary magazine
Sport (Spanish newspaper)
Sport (UK magazine)
Sport (US magazine)
DSL Sport, a Serbian newspaper
Sport Newspapers, an English publishing firm responsible for The Daily Sport, Sunday Sport and several "lads' " magazines
The Sport (Adelaide newspaper) (1910–1948), a sporting and general interest weekly in South Australia

Television

Channels
 Sport (Turkmen TV channel)
 Match! Arena, a Russian high-definition television channel in 2010–2016 operated by VGTRK and acquired by Gazprom-Media
 Match! Game, formerly known as Sport-2, a Russian television channel in 2012–2016 operated by VGTRK and acquired by Gazprom-Media
 Russia-2 Sport (launched in 2003), alternatively known as RTR-Sport, a defunct Russian television channel in 2003–2009 operated by VGTRK
 NTV Plus Sport (launched in 1996), a defunct Russian television channel in 1996–2016

Episodes
"Sport", the third episode of ChuckleVision

Biology
Sport (botany), a part of a plant that shows morphological differences from the rest of the plant, typically as a result of somatic mutation
Fern sports were widely collected
Sport, a macromutation, traditionally called a sport, notably by Charles Darwin 
Bud sport, a naturally occurring genetic mutation

Other uses
Sport (Antwerp premetro station), a railway station in Antwerp, Belgium
Sport (camera), a Soviet 35 mm SLR camera launched in 1937
Sport (tug), an American tugboat wrecked on Lake Huron in 1920
Sport, a trim for motor vehicles (See List of sports cars#Sport Trims)
Airwave Sport, an Austrian paraglider design
Sky Polarization Observatory (SPOrt), a cancelled Italian space observatory
Sportcoat or sports coat, a type of jacket that originated for men's wear in shooting, among other outdoor sports
Toyota Sports, Toyota Sports 800, Toyota Sports EV, vehicles made by Toyota

See also
Water sport
Sporting (disambiguation)
Sportsman (disambiguation)